Macaduma castneogriseata is a moth of the subfamily Arctiinae. It was described by Rothschild in 1912. It is found in Papua New Guinea.

References

Macaduma
Moths described in 1912